Eupithecia inquinata is a moth in the family Geometridae. It was described by David Stephen Fletcher in 1950 and it is found in Ethiopia.

References

Moths described in 1950
inquinata
Moths of Africa